The 1960 Eastern Michigan Hurons football team represented Eastern Michigan University in the Interstate Intercollegiate Athletic Conference (IIAC) during the 1960 NCAA College Division football season. In their ninth season under head coach Fred Trosko, the Hurons compiled a 0–8–1 record (0–5–1 against IIAC opponents) and were outscored by their opponents, 230 to 38. The team played Illinois State to a 14–14 tie.  Alfred E. Iverson was the team captain. The team's statistical leaders included Bill Yanis with 388 yards of total offense and the same measure in receiving yards, George Beaudette with 339 passing yards, and Jim Dills with 231 rushing yards. Leonard Natkowski received the team's most valuable player award.

The 1960 season was part of a 29-game winless streak that spanned from 1959 to 1962. The 1960 Eastern Michigan team had 35 fumbles. It also set an Eastern Michigan record (which still stands) for the fewest net yards of total offense – 554 (an average of 61.5 yards per game).  The season reached a low point on October 29, 1960, with a 66-8 loss against the Southern Illinois Salukis, a game in which the Salukis scored two touchdowns in the first 23 seconds of the game.

Schedule

References

Eastern Michigan
Eastern Michigan Eagles football seasons
College football winless seasons
Eastern Michigan Hurons football